Two Forms (Divided Circle) (BH 477) is a bronze sculpture by Barbara Hepworth, designed in 1969. Six numbered copies were cast, plus one (0/6) retained by the sculptor.

The front of the base has "Barbara Hepworth 1969" inscribed on it followed by the number of the sculpture, as well as "Morris | Singer | FOUNDERS | LONDON", both inscribed by casting.

The sculpture is considered to be one of Britain's most recognisable works.

The sculpture is late work by Hepworth, created only 6 years before her death in a fire at her studio in St Ives in 1975. Both elements are welded to a bronze base. All three elements are hollow, and were cast in London by Morris Singer.

Hepworth designed the work after being diagnosed with cancer in 1966. She wanted the viewer's body to be engaged with her work, saying: "You can climb through the Divided Circle – you don't need to do it physically to experience it."

Casts

See also 
List of heists in the United Kingdom
Reclining Figure 1969–70

References

External links
 

Bronze sculptures in the United Kingdom
1969 sculptures
Modernist sculpture
Bronze sculptures in the United States
Sculptures by Barbara Hepworth
Stolen works of art